Fort Miller may refer to:

 Fort Miller, California, a former Army post and town in California.
 Fort Miller (Massachusetts), a former fort in Marblehead.